La Science du cœur is a studio album by Pierre Lapointe, released through Audiogram and Columbia Records France on October 6, 2017.

Reception
The album made the long list for the 2018 Polaris Music Prize, and received a Juno Award nomination for Francophone Album of the Year. It won the award for "Album of the Year – Adult Contemporary" at the 40th ADISQ Gala.

Track listing
 "La Science du cœur" – 4:08
 "Qu'il est honteux d'être humain" – 2:48
 "Sais-tu vraiment qui tu es" – 3:29
 "Le retour d'un amour" – 4:28
 "Mon prince charmant" – 3:05
 "Comme un soleil" – 2:46
 "Zopiclone" – 2:56
 "Alphabet" – 3:46
 "Naoshima" – 2:01
 "Un cœur" – 3:35
 "Une lettre" – 3:21

Charts

References

2017 albums
Audiogram (label) albums
French-language albums
Pierre Lapointe albums